Zhetybay (also known as Zhetibay (Jetıbai, جەتىباي)) is a town in Mangystau Region, southwest Kazakhstan. It has a population of 11,731.

References

Mangystau Region
Cities and towns in Kazakhstan